The Dayun Group is a Chinese conglomerate based in Yuncheng, Shanxi, China.  Through its subsidiaries, it manufactures heavy trucks, light trucks, motorcycles and engines.

Divisions

Yuanhang Auto
On the 2022 Chengdu Auto Show a new EV brand called Yuanhang Auto appeared. Yuanhang (远航) means ‘Voyage’ in Chinese. They unveiled four cars that will go into production in 2023. Yuanhang Auto is a premium brand under the Dayun Group, based in Yuncheng, Shanxi Province.
Yuanhang Y6
Yuanhang Y7
Yuanhang H8
Yuanhang H9

Dayun Passenger vehicles
Dayun Pika (Dayun Pickup)- Mid-size pickup
Dayun Ruihu ES3- Electric mini crossover SUV
Dayun Chihu EM6- Electric compact MPV
Dayun CGC6450 (CGC6450FPD28E)- Compact MPV

Trucks

Dayun Light Truck
Chengdu Dayun Automotive Group Co. Ltd., commonly known as Dayun Light Truck, is a light truck manufacturer based in Chengdu, Sichuan, China, and a division of Dayun Group.  It was founded by the Dayun Group in 2009.  Light trucks are manufactured under the Dayun brand.

Models

Dayun E2
Dayun Chuanlu 490
Dayun Chuanlu 4100
Dayun Chuanlu 4102
Dayun Chuanlu 4108
Dayun QiYun 485
Dayun QiYun 490
Dayun QiYun 4100
Dayun QiYun 4102
Dayun QiYun 4105
Dayun QiYun 4108
Dayun QiYun 4110

Dayun Motor
Shanxi Dayun Automobile Manufacturing Co., Ltd, known as Dayun Motor, is a heavy truck manufacturer located in Yuncheng, Shanxi, China.  It was founded in 2004 as part of the Dayun Group.  They are able to build up to 50,000 trucks a year.  Trucks are built under the Dayun brand.

Models
Dayun CGC1047PB33E3 2x4 light truck
Dayun CGC1048PX28E3 2x4 light truck
Dayun CGC1140 
Dayun CGC1141 2x4
Dayun CGC1160 4x6
Dayun CGC1254 4x6
Dayun CGC1311 4x8
Dayun CGC4180 semi tractor
Dayun CGC4181 semi tractor
Dayun CGC4220 semi tractor
Dayun CGC4222 semi tractor
Dayun CGC4250 semi tractor
Dayun CGC4251 semi tractor
Dayun CGC4252 semi tractor
Dayun CGC4252 CNG semi tractor
Dayun CGC4252 LNG semi tractor
Dayun CGC4253 CNG semi tractor
Dayun CGC4253  LNG semi tractor
Dayun DYX1250 4x6
Dayun DYX1312 4x8
Dayun DYX3251 4x6 Dump truck
Dayun DYX3253 4x6 Dump truck
Dayun DYX3311 4x8 Dump truck
Dayun DYX3313 4x8 Dump truck
Dayun DYX3313 LNG 4x8 Dump truck
Dayun DYX5250 4x6
Dayun DYX5253 4x6
Dayun DYX5310 semi tractor
Dayun DYX5312 4x8

Motorcycles

Dayun Motorcycle manufactures Dayun motorcycles and scooters.
Dayang Motorcycle manufactures Dayang motorcycles and scooters.
Luoyang Duyan - manufactures Dayun three-wheeled scooters

References

External links
Dayun Group webpage

Motorcycle manufacturers of China
Truck manufacturers of China
Companies based in Shanxi
Companies established in 1987
Chinese brands